"Summer Rain" is a song written by Robbie Seidman and Maria Vidal, produced by Rick Nowels for Belinda Carlisle's third album Runaway Horses (1989). The power ballad is about a man who goes away to war and leaves his wife, saying that nothing will change—they will be together forever and always. Although the conflict is unidentified, images in the video of a transport aircraft on an airfield and troops parachuting from transport aircraft suggest the man is an airborne soldier.  The song is set in the present as his widow sings it, remembering the last time she saw him. It was released around the world in 1990 and was issued as a CD single, 7-inch single and a 12-inch single.

The song had reasonable success on the charts reaching the top 30 in the United States and the United Kingdom. In Australia, it reached the top 10, peaking at number six. It was later covered by artists including Slinkee Minx, whose 2004 cover version charted higher than the original in Australia, reaching number five. Carlisle stated in May 2013 that "Summer Rain" was her favorite song from her recording career.

Release and commercial performance
"Summer Rain" achieved moderate commercial success in North America, where it was released as the second single from Runaway Horses (1989). In January 1990, the song entered the Billboard Hot 100, the main US chart, at number 86. Within seven weeks of its release, it peaked at number 30 and stayed at that position for two weeks. The single spent 13 weeks on the Billboard Hot 100, six of which were in the top 50. The single was Carlisle's second to last song to chart on the Billboard Hot 100. It also peaked at number 29 on the US Billboard Adult Contemporary chart, where it spent eight weeks on the chart.

In Australia, the song had the most commercial success, where it was released as the album's third single on March 19, 1990. In early April 1990, it debuted at number 42. Within two months of its release, it reached the top 10, where it stayed for five weeks. The song reached a peak at number six on May 20 and remained there for two more weeks, spending a total of 16 weeks in the top 50. It became the 40th highest-selling single in Australia for 1990.

The song was released in the United Kingdom in December 1990 as the sixth and final release from Runaway Horses, peaking at number 23 at the end of January 1991 and spending 10 weeks in the chart.

Music video

The official music video for the song was directed by Andy Morahan.

Track listing
CD single
 "Summer Rain"
 "Summer Rain" (Justin Strauss Mix)
 "Leave a Light On" (Kamikazee mix)

Personnel
 Bekka Bramlett – background vocals
 Paul Buckmaster – string arrangement
 Donna De Lory – background vocals
 X.Y. Jones – guitar
 Charles Judge – keyboards
 John Pierce – bass
 Maria Vidal – background vocals

Charts and certifications

Weekly charts

Year-end charts

Certifications

Slinkee Minx version

"Summer Rain" was recorded by Australian dance act Slinkee Minx in 2004 for their first album, Electric Dreams (2007). It was the first song released from the album, and was released in Australia on August 9, 2004, as a CD single. The song was released under the record label Central Station and was produced by Mike Felks.

The song made its debut on the singles chart at number five, hitting the top spot on the dance chart, knocking off "Push Up" by the Freestylers. In its second week, it fell out of the top ten to number eleven but jumped back into the top ten, staying there for four more weeks. It spent fifteen weeks in the top fifty and eighteen weeks in the top one hundred, becoming the sixty-first highest selling single in Australia for 2004 and was accredited gold by ARIA. "Summer Rain" was released to clubs in more than fifty countries including the US, UK and other countries in Europe.

Music video
A music video was produced to promote the single.

Track listings
CD single
 "Summer Rain" (radio edit) – 4:15
 "Summer Rain" (Zander radio edit) – 4:08
 "Summer Rain" (KCB remix) – 7:57
 "Summer Rain" (Zander club mix) – 7:11
 "Tell Me" (radio edit) – 4:34

UK CD single (All Around the World CDGLOBE395)
 "Summer Rain" (Alex K radio edit) – 3:54
 "Summer Rain" (Alex K remix) – 6:07
 "Summer Rain" (Clubstar remix) – 6:36
 "Summer Rain" (KB Project remix) – 5:29
 "Summer Rain" (Lee S remix) – 6:14
 "Summer Rain" (Friday Night Posse remix) – 6:36

Charts

Weekly charts

Year-end charts

Certifications

Groove Coverage version
Groove Coverage, a German dance act, released their version of the song in 2007.

Track listing
CD single
 "Summer Rain" – 3:59
 "Summer Rain" (extended version) – 4:58
 "Summer Rain" (Rob Mayth extended) – 6:24
 "Summer Rain" (Rob Mayth radio) – 3:45
 "Summer Rain" (Delaction remix) – 6:03

Matt Fishel version
In 2014, "Summer Rain" was recorded by British singer Matt Fishel for his EP titled Cover Boy. Fishel's version of the song, produced by Fishel and Mark Crew, is more guitar-led than Carlisle's original and features elements of pop rock and alternative rock. The song begins and ends with thunder sound effects. For his version, Fishel keeps all the same lyrics and male pronouns from the original. It appears as the opening track on Fishel's Cover Boy EP, released on July 14, 2014, on Young Lust Records.

References

1990s ballads
1990 songs
1990 singles
2004 singles
Belinda Carlisle songs
MCA Records singles
Music videos directed by Andy Morahan
Pop ballads
Slinkee Minx songs
Songs written by Maria Vidal
Song recordings produced by Rick Nowels
Virgin Records singles